The United Arab Republic national basketball team or in ( Arabic: منتخب الجمهورية العربية المتحدة لكرة السلة للرجال ) was a historical national basketball team that existed between the year 1958–1971 that has represented first the United Arab Republic which was a union between Egypt (including the occupied Gaza Strip) and Syria from 1958 to 1961 and then the name has continued with Egypt until the year 1971.

History
The United Arab Republic men's national basketball team has since the foundation back in 1958 won three African Championships from 3 appearances and has participated in two World Championships but has no Olympic appearances.

Performance table

FIBA World Cup

FIBA Africa Championship

African Games

Pan Arab Games

Mediterranean Games

References

External links
Official website
FIBA profile
Egyptian basketball records at FIBA Archive
AfroBasket – Egyptian men's national team

Men's national basketball teams